The Museum of Science & History (MOSH) is a museum in Jacksonville, Florida. It is a private, non-profit institution located on the Southbank Riverwalk, and the city's most visited museum. It specializes in science and local history exhibits. It features a large traveling exhibit that changes quarterly, three floors of permanent and signature exhibits, and the Bryan-Gooding Planetarium.

History
The roots of MOSH go back to 1941 when the Jacksonville Children's Museum was chartered. The first permanent home was a Victorian mansion in Riverside. Construction began on the current location downtown in 1965, and the facility opened in 1969. The Jacksonville Children's Museum became the Jacksonville Museum of Arts and Sciences in 1977 and six years later, they were accredited by the American Alliance of Museums. In 2010 the Planetarium was upgraded with a new projector, sound system, and interior work, and renamed the Bryan-Gooding Planetarium. In 2013, the museum opened a new core exhibit, JEA PowerPlay: Understanding Our Energy Choices and the newly renovated JEA Science Theater. In 2016, the museum opened another new core exhibit, Health in Motion: Discover What MOVES You, as well as a new outdoor sustainable landscape exhibit called JEA HydroLogic.

In 2021, MOSH announced it would relocate to the Northbank of downtown Jacksonville with a new facility designed by architectural firm DLR Group. The new facility would increase the museum's space from 77,000 to 133,000 SF.

Exhibits
Current exhibits at Jacksonville’s museum of science and history includes the new Playing With Lights exhibits. This exhibit uses lasers to manipulate light. At twenty-one different stations, visitors can poke, prod, and bend light. The museum also offers light and laser shows within the exhibit multiple times a day. One exhibit that will always remain at the museum is the Jacksonville history exhibit. Located on the loft floor, the exhibit includes information about Jacksonville dating back around two hundred years. The Museum of Science and History also currently has the bicentennial exhibit located on their third floor. This exhibit shows how events such as fires, floods, disease, and other monumental events have shaped Jacksonville's economy, environment, and future. This exhibit will be a portion of the already existing Current Time exhibit. Upcoming exhibits will include WeaveTales and a Jacksonville Shipwreck branch. WeaveTales seeks to bring awareness to refugees and their families. The WeaveTales exhibit will include information pertaining to refugees within North Florida and highlight some women’s journey to Jacksonville. Previously shown at Jacksonville’s MOCA, the exhibit arrives at the city’s MOSH in May 2022. This exhibit will be available for a three-month period at the museum. The Jacksonville Shipwreck branch will be located at the old shipyard in downtown Jacksonville. This location would include two and a half acres of history related to Jacksonville’s shipping industry. It would also include a river walk.

References

External links

Museums in Jacksonville, Florida
Planetaria in the United States
Science museums in Florida
Natural history museums in Florida
History museums in Florida
Institutions accredited by the American Alliance of Museums
Downtown Jacksonville
Southbank, Jacksonville
Jacksonville Modern architecture
1969 establishments in Florida